The Athens City School District is a public school district in Athens County, Ohio, United States, based in Athens, Ohio.

Schools
The Athens City School District has two primary (PK-3) elementary schools, one intermediate (4-6) elementary school, one middle school, and one high school.

Elementary schools 
East Elementary School
Morrison Gordon Elementary School
The Plains Intermediate School

Middle school
Athens Middle School

High school
Athens High School

References

External links
Athens City School District

School districts in Ohio